Fred Rosen may refer to:

 Fred Rosen (physician) (1930–2005), paediatrician and immunologist at Harvard Medical School
 Fred Rosen (author), true crime author and former columnist for The New York Times
 Fred Rosen (businessman), former CEO of Ticketmaster, co-founder of the Bel Air Homeowners Alliance

See also
 Fred Rose (disambiguation)